Butlers Chocolates is an Irish owned manufacturer of luxury chocolate and chocolate products which operates from a custom-built production facility in North Dublin. Founded by Marion Bailey, the manufacturer produces a wide range of confectionery products including chocolate bars, truffles, fudge, toffee, chocolate eggs and seasonal novelties. The company has also created a chain of Butlers Chocolate Cafes. The name should not be confused with the medieval Irish noble family, the Butler dynasty.

History
Butlers chocolates was founded in 1932 by Ms Bailey-Butler. Based in Dublin's Lad Lane, Ms. Bailey-Butler developed a range of handmade chocolates.

In 1959 the company was purchased by Mr. Seamus Sorensen and in 1984 the Butlers Irish Chocolates brand was born. The company was named in memory of Ms. Marion Bailey-Butler.

Five years later, in 1989 Butlers Chocolates first retail outlet opened in Grafton Street in Dublin City Centre. Since then retail outlets have opened up all over Ireland. Butler's have also expanded into the market in the United Kingdom with the opening of the company's first UK cafe in Westfield London and their chocolates are now widely available in most major airports throughout the UK and at Waitrose stores.

In 1989 Butlers Chocolate Cafe opened Dublin's Wicklow Street. To date fourteen Butlers Chocolate Cafes have opened, including 2 franchises in New Zealand.

In 2003 Butlers Chocolates relocated to Clonshaugh, Dublin 17.

From 2006 to the present day Butlers have developed new products, launching their first organic chocolate range, dark chocolate selection, 200g Chocolate cube range, Butlers Chocolate Café ice cream as well as Take Home Ice Cream amongst others. Also in collaboration, Butlers Chocolates launched a range of chocolates with Irish Fashion designer, Orla Kiely.

Butlers Chocolate Cafés

The first Butlers Chocolate Café opened in Dublin in 1998 and since then, they have opened a further 39 Butlers Chocolate Cafés – in Dublin, Cork, Galway, Limerick, Naas, Lucan, Kildare & Swords (Ireland), Wellington, Auckland, Paraparaumu, Lower Hutt & Porirua (New Zealand), Karachi, Lahore & Islamabad (Pakistan), Dhaka (Bangladesh), Dubai (UAE) and Dammam & Riyadh (Saudi Arabia).

Butlers plans to expand internationally using the franchise model, excluding Ireland and the UK.

References

Food companies of the Republic of Ireland
Food and drink companies established in 1932
Food and drink companies based in Dublin (city)
Manufacturing companies based in Dublin (city)
1932 establishments in Ireland
Irish brands
Chocolate companies